Tork: Prehistoric Punk is a platform video game released on January 12, 2005 for the Xbox video game console. It was developed by Tiwak and published by Ubisoft. The game was never released outside the United States.

In the game, players control the title character as he fights back against an evil sorcerer who is trying to destroy his world. He is a shapeshifter who travels through time to change history, transforming into three "spirit" animals along the way: a squirrel, a Yeti, and an armadillo. Various periods from the Stone Age to the fictitious "Age of Fantastical Machines" are represented.

The game is similar to and resembles the THQ video game series, Tak and the Power of Juju.

Development
Developed by Tiwak, a group founded by former Rayman 2 developers, Tork was originally planned to be published by Microsoft Studios for release in 2004. However, following Ed Fries' departure from the company, Microsoft dropped the game (though retained the rights to Tork intellectual property). On April 21, 2004, Ubisoft announced that it had acquired the publishing rights from Microsoft (in addition to purchasing developer Tiwak and merging it with its Montpellier studio) and would be releasing Tork: Prehistoric Punk in North America in January 2005 for the budget retail price of $19.99.

Critical response

The game received "mixed" reviews according to the review aggregation website Metacritic.

References

External links

 Teaser
 Trailer (E3)
 Gameplay

2005 video games
3D platform games
Dinosaurs in video games
North America-exclusive video games
Prehistoric people in popular culture
Single-player video games
Therianthropy
Ubisoft games
Video games about shapeshifting
Video games about time travel
Video games developed in France
Video games set in prehistory
Wizards in fiction
Xbox games
Xbox-only games